Stephen Thompson (born February 11, 1983) is an American professional mixed martial artist and model. Thompson currently competes in the Welterweight division for the Ultimate Fighting Championship (UFC). He is a former full-contact kickboxer and was undefeated through 37 amateur and 20 professional kickboxing matches. Thompson is regarded as one of the most accomplished strikers in the UFC. As of March 7, 2023, he is #7 in the UFC welterweight rankings.

Thompson is well known for his polite demeanor, and is often cited by other fighters as one of the most respectful fighters in the UFC.

Early life 
Thompson was born on February 11, 1983, in Simpsonville, South Carolina. He has two sisters and two brothers. Thompson started training at the age of three, under the guidance of his father, Ray Thompson, a former professional kickboxer and owner of Upstate Karate, a karate school in Simpsonville, South Carolina.

Thompson started competing in kickboxing and karate at the age of 15. He holds black belt ranks in Tetsushin-ryū Kempo, American Kickboxing and Jujutsu. He studies Brazilian Jiu-Jitsu under Carlos Machado who is also his brother-in-law. Thompson graduated from high school in 2001 and is the Head Instructor of the children's karate program at Upstate Karate.

Martial arts career

Early career in kickboxing
Thompson's father, Ray, is his trainer and manager.

As an amateur kickboxer Thompson amassed 16 titles and finished his career with a record of 37 wins, 18 by knockout and no losses.

He turned professional on May 15, 2004 against Kadir Kadri who he defeated by knockout in the fifth round.

On December 14, 2004 Thompson traveled to Montreal, Canada to face Eric Boudreau at "La renaissance du Kickboxing" event. He won the fight by technical knockout in the fifth round.

On May 21, 2005 Thompson rematched Kadir Kadri at Martial Arts May-Hem 05 in Greenville, South Carolina. He won the fight by unanimous decision.

On September 3, 2005 Thompson faced Freddie Espiricueta at the APEX – Undisputed event in Montreal, Canada. Thompson won the fight by technical knockout in the third round.

Thompson has also been featured in Martial Arts Digest magazine, Fighter magazine, and MMA Authority magazine.

Thompson has performed along with his father at the Peace Center for the Performing Arts in the “Athletes Project”, and has appeared in several TV commercials.

In 2006, Thompson joined the newly created World Combat League. He went undefeated during that year earning wins over opponents such as Antoine McRae, Armin Mrkanovic, James DeCore, Tim Williams and Carlos Tearney. He was the #1 ranked fighter in World Combat League at the end of 2006.

On January 20, 2007 Thompson fought Raymond Daniels in a highly anticipated bout. Thompson lost the bout by technical knockout due to a knee injury he suffered that left him unable to continue. However, this was later overturned into a no contest.

During his recovery Thompson chose to transition from kickboxing to professional mixed martial arts.

Ultimate Fighting Championship

2012
Thompson was expected to face Justin Edwards on February 4, 2012, at UFC 143, replacing an injured Mike Stumpf. However, Edwards was forced out with an injury and replaced by Dan Stittgen. Thompson won the fight via KO in the first round after landing a flush head kick. For his performance, Thompson was awarded Knockout of the Night honors.

Thompson lost to Matt Brown on April 21, 2012, at UFC 145 via unanimous decision (30–27, 29–27, and 30–27).

Thompson was expected to face Besam Yousef on November 17, 2012, at UFC 154. However, Thompson was forced out of the bout with a knee injury and replaced by Matthew Riddle.

2013
Thompson was expected to face Amir Sadollah on May 25, 2013, at UFC 160. However, Sadollah pulled out of the bout, citing an injury, and he was replaced by Nah-Shon Burrell. Thompson won the fight via unanimous decision.

Thompson next faced Chris Clements on September 21, 2013, at UFC 165. After dropping Clements twice, Thompson won the fight via knockout in the second round.

2014
Thompson faced future UFC middleweight champion Robert Whittaker on February 22, 2014, at UFC 170. Thompson won the bout via first-round technical knockout. The win also earned him his first Performance of the Night bonus award.

Thompson faced Patrick Côté on September 27, 2014, at UFC 178. Despite knocking Côté down in the third round and almost finishing the bout, Thompson ultimately won the fight via unanimous decision.

2015
Thompson was expected to headline against Brandon Thatch on February 14, 2015, at UFC Fight Night 60. However, Thompson pulled out of the fight on January 30, citing a rib injury, and was replaced by former UFC Lightweight Champion Benson Henderson.

Thompson faced Jake Ellenberger on July 12, 2015, at The Ultimate Fighter 21 Finale. He won the fight via KO in the first round and earned a Performance of the Night bonus.

2016
Thompson was expected to face Neil Magny on January 2, 2016, at UFC 195. However, Magny was tabbed as an injury replacement for Matt Brown and instead faced Kelvin Gastelum on November 21, 2015, at The Ultimate Fighter Latin America 2 Finale. In turn, Thompson was removed from the card and rebooked to face former champion Johny Hendricks on February 6, 2016, at UFC Fight Night 82. He won the bout via TKO in the first round. The win also earned Thompson his third Performance of the Night bonus award.

Thompson next faced Rory MacDonald on June 18, 2016, at UFC Fight Night 89. He won the fight via unanimous decision (50–45, 50–45, and 48–47).

Thompson fought for the UFC Welterweight Championship at UFC 205, where he faced reigning champion Tyron Woodley. The fight ended in a majority draw with two judges scoring the fight 47–47 and the third 48–47 in favor of Woodley. However, there was some confusion as the result was initially announced as a split decision victory for Woodley only to be corrected moments later when the decision of a majority draw was announced, albeit with the same result of Woodley remaining champion. Subsequently, both fighters were awarded Fight of the Night bonus awards. UFC President Dana White stated that he expected that a rematch would be next for each fighter.

2017
The rematch with Woodley took place on March 4, 2017, in the main event at UFC 209. Thompson lost the bout by majority decision (48–47, 47–47, and 48–47). In a sample of 19 media pundits scoring the fight, five scored it in favor of Woodley, six scored in favor of Thompson, and eight scored it a draw.

Thompson faced Jorge Masvidal on November 4, 2017 at UFC 217. He won the one-sided fight via unanimous decision (30–26, 30–27, and 30–27).

2018
As the first bout of his new multi-fight contract, Thompson faced Darren Till on May 27, 2018 at UFC Fight Night 130. At the weigh-ins, Till weighed in at 174.5 pounds, 3.5 pounds over the welterweight non-title fight limit of 171. After negotiating with Thompson's team, the bout proceeded at a catchweight, with the stipulation that Till could not weigh more than 188 pounds on the day of the fight. Till also forfeited 30 percent of his purse to Thompson. Thompson lost the bout via unanimous decision (48–47, 49–46, and 49–46). Conversely, 22 of 25 media outlets scored the bout in favor of Thompson.

2019
Thompson faced former UFC Lightweight champion Anthony Pettis in the headliner of UFC on ESPN+ 6 on March 23, 2019. Despite outstriking Pettis for most of the bout, he lost the fight via knockout in the second round, marking the first time that Thompson had been stopped in MMA or kickboxing competition.

Thompson faced Vicente Luque on November 2, 2019 at UFC 244. He won the fight via unanimous decision. This fight earned him the Fight of the Night award.

2020
Thompson faced Geoff Neal on December 19, 2020 in the headliner UFC Fight Night 183. He won the fight via unanimous decision. This win earned him the Performance of the Night  award.

2021
Thompson faced Gilbert Burns on July 10, 2021 at UFC 264  He lost the fight via unanimous decision.

As the first bout of his new six-fight contract, Thompson faced Belal Muhammad on December 18, 2021 at UFC Fight Night: Lewis vs. Daukaus. He lost via unanimous decision after being forced into bottom position on the ground for a large portion of each round.

2022
Thompson faced Kevin Holland on December 3, 2022, at UFC on ESPN 42, in the main event. He won the fight by technical knockout after Holland's corner stopped the fight after the fourth round. This fight earned both the Fight of the Night award.

Fighting style
Thompson is well known for his Kempo style of karate which he has trained in from an early age. This karate background is evident in the stance he adopts, as his feet stand far apart and he sits wide with his hands low. This style is very uncommon in MMA, with most fighters having a background in wrestling or jiu-jitsu, or striking arts like boxing, muay thai, or other styles of kickboxing. His wide, karate stance allows him to cover distance, and launch kicks rapidly, which he is known for doing. Analysts and fighters have praised 'Wonderboy' for his ability to keep other fighters in his range whilst staying out of theirs. The risk of being knocked out compels most fighters to keep their hands up in 'guard', but Thompson, among others such as Jiří Procházka, keeps their hands very low. The benefits of a very low guard are that your punches and elbows become very hard to predict, and you are better prepared to defend against takedowns. Thompson is more suited to keeping his hands low than other fighters who adopt more orthodox MMA stances, as he can negate the risk of being hit with a clean shot to the head through his footwork and rapid movement. His footwork is simply described as "hopping back and forth", like other practitioners do such as Conor McGregor and Zhang Weili. The benefit of this "hopping" while in neutral is that, like the low or non-existent guard, that your striking and movement becomes unpredictable.

Personal life
Thompson's sister is married to Carlos Machado and Thompson's brother, Tony, is married to Chris Weidman's sister.

In 2017, he signed a contract with international modeling agency IMG Models.

Entertainment career
In 2022, Thompson made his acting debut as Sensei Morozov in two episodes of season 5 of the Netflix series Cobra Kai.

Championships and accomplishments

Amateur Full-Contact Kickboxing
All championship information from WonderBoyMMA.com

1999 I.S.K.A Georgia State Middleweight Amateur Champion
2000 I.S.K.A Southeast Middleweight Amateur Champion
2000 I.K.F South East Light Middleweight Amateur Champion
2000 I.K.F National Amateur Tournament Middleweight Champion
2000 P.K.C National Light Middleweight Amateur Champion
2000 U.S.A.K.B.F North American Middleweight Amateur Champion
2001 P.K.C National Light Heavyweight Amateur Champion
2001 U.S.A.K.B.F Light Heavyweight Amateur World Champion
2001 W.P.K.A Light Heavyweight Amateur World Champion
2001 I.K.F National Tournament Light Heavyweight Champion
2002 I.K.F National Tournament Light Heavyweight Champion
2002 I.K.F North American Light Cruiserweight Champion
2003 I.K.F World Light Cruiserweight Champion
2003 K.I.C.K North American Cruiserweight Champion
2003 I.A.K.S.A Cruiserweight World Champion
2005 W.A.K.O World Championships Cruiserweight Champion

Mixed martial arts
Ultimate Fighting Championship
Fight of the Night (Three times) 
Knockout of the Night (One time) 
Performance of the Night (Four times) 
MMAjunkie.com
2022 December Fight of the Month

Mixed martial arts record

|-
|Win
|align=center|17–6–1
|Kevin Holland
|TKO (corner stoppage)
|UFC on ESPN: Thompson vs. Holland
|
|align=center|4
|align=center|5:00
|Orlando, Florida, United States
|
|-
|Loss
|align=center|16–6–1
|Belal Muhammad
|Decision (unanimous)
|UFC Fight Night: Lewis vs. Daukaus
|
|align=center|3
|align=center|5:00
|Las Vegas, Nevada, United States
|
|-
|Loss
|align=center|16–5–1
|Gilbert Burns
|Decision (unanimous)
|UFC 264
|
|align=center|3
|align=center|5:00
|Las Vegas, Nevada, United States
|
|-
|Win
|align=center|16–4–1
|Geoff Neal
|Decision (unanimous)
|UFC Fight Night: Thompson vs. Neal
|
|align=center|5
|align=center|5:00
|Las Vegas, Nevada, United States
|
|-
|Win
|align=center|15–4–1
|Vicente Luque
|Decision (unanimous)
|UFC 244
|
|align=center|3
|align=center|5:00
|New York City, New York, United States
|
|-
|Loss
|align=center|14–4–1
|Anthony Pettis
|KO (punches) 
|UFC Fight Night: Thompson vs. Pettis
|
|align=center|2
|align=center|4:55
|Nashville, Tennessee, United States
|
|-
|Loss
|align=center|14–3–1
|Darren Till
|Decision (unanimous)
|UFC Fight Night: Thompson vs. Till
|
|align=center|5
|align=center|5:00
|Liverpool, England
|
|-
|Win
|align=center|14–2–1
|Jorge Masvidal
|Decision (unanimous)
|UFC 217
|
|align=center|3
|align=center|5:00
|New York City, New York, United States
|
|-
|Loss
|align=center|13–2–1
|Tyron Woodley
|Decision (majority)
|UFC 209
|
|align=center|5
|align=center|5:00
|Las Vegas, Nevada, United States
|
|-
|Draw
|align=center|
|Tyron Woodley
|Draw (majority)
|UFC 205 
|
|align=center|5
|align=center|5:00
|New York City, New York, United States
|
|-
|Win
|align=center|13–1
|Rory MacDonald
|Decision (unanimous)
|UFC Fight Night: MacDonald vs. Thompson
|
|align=center|5
|align=center|5:00
|Ottawa, Ontario, Canada
|
|-
|Win
|align=center|12–1
|Johny Hendricks
||TKO (punches)
|UFC Fight Night: Hendricks vs. Thompson
|
|align=center|1
|align=center|3:31
|Las Vegas, Nevada, United States
|
|-
|Win
|align=center|11–1
|Jake Ellenberger
|KO (spinning wheel kick)
|The Ultimate Fighter: American Top Team vs. Blackzilians Finale
|
|align=center|1
|align=center|4:29
|Las Vegas, Nevada, United States
|
|-
|Win
|align=center|10–1
|Patrick Côté
|Decision (unanimous)
|UFC 178
|
|align=center|3
|align=center|5:00
|Las Vegas, Nevada, United States
|
|-
|Win
|align=center|9–1
|Robert Whittaker
|TKO (punches)
|UFC 170
|
|align=center|1
|align=center|3:43
|Las Vegas, Nevada, United States
|
|-
|Win
|align=center|8–1
| Chris Clements
|TKO (punches)
|UFC 165
|
|align=center|2
|align=center|1:27
|Toronto, Ontario, Canada
| 
|-
|Win
|align=center|7–1
| Nah-Shon Burrell
|Decision (unanimous)
|UFC 160
|
|align=center|3
|align=center|5:00
|Las Vegas, Nevada, United States
| 
|-
|Loss
|align=center|6–1
| Matt Brown
|Decision (unanimous)
|UFC 145
|
|align=center|3
|align=center|5:00
|Atlanta, Georgia, United States
| 
|-
|Win
|align=center|6–0
|Dan Stittgen
|KO (head kick)
|UFC 143
|
|align=center|1
|align=center|4:13
|Las Vegas, Nevada, United States
| 
|-
|Win
|align=center|5–0
| Patrick Mandio
|Decision (unanimous)
|Fight Party: Masquerade Fight Party
|
|align=center|3
|align=center|5:00
|Atlanta, Georgia, United States
| 
|-
|Win
|align=center|4–0
| William Kuhn
|Decision (unanimous)
|Xtreme Chaos 2
|
|align=center|3
|align=center|5:00
|Anderson, South Carolina, United States
|
|-
|Win
|align=center|3–0
| Marques Worrell
|Submission (rear-naked choke)
|Fight Party: Greenville Kage Fighting 2
|
|align=center|2
|align=center|3:08
|Greenville, South Carolina, United States
|
|-
|Win
|align=center|2–0
| Daniel Finz
|TKO (punches)
|Fight Party: Xtreme Cage Fighting 2
|
|align=center|1
|align=center|3:45
|Greenville, South Carolina, United States
|
|-
|Win
|align=center|1–0
| Jeremy Joles
|TKO (head kick and punches)
|Fight Party: Greenville Kage Fighting
|
|align=center|2
|align=center|3:40
|Greenville, South Carolina, United States
|
|-

Kickboxing record (incomplete)

|-
|-  bgcolor="#c5d2ea"
| 2007-01-20 || NC ||align=left| Raymond Daniels || World Combat League|| Philadelphia, Pennsylvania, USA || Knee injury|| 1 ||
|-
! style=background:white colspan=9 |originally a TKO (injury), overturned to a NC

|-  bgcolor="#cfc"
| 2006-11-10 || Win ||align=left| Carlos Tearney || World Combat League  || Miami, Florida, United States || Points || 2 || 3:00

|-  bgcolor="#cfc"
| 2006- || Win ||align=left| Tim Williams || World Combat League  || United States || KO (Head kick)|| 1 ||

|-  bgcolor="#cfc"
| 2006- || Win ||align=left| James DeCore || World Combat League  || United States || KO (Head kick)|| 1 ||

|-  bgcolor="#cfc"
| 2006- || Win ||align=left| Armin Mrkanovic || World Combat League  ||  United States || Points|| 1 ||3:00

|-  bgcolor="#cfc"
| 2006- || Win ||align=left| Antoine McRae || World Combat League  ||  United States || TKO (Referee stopapge)|| 1 ||

|-  bgcolor="#cfc"
| 2006-01-21 || Win ||align=left| Jose Louriero || World Combat League  || Miami, Florida, United States || TKO (Referee stopapge)|| 1 ||

|-  bgcolor="#cfc"
| 2006-01-21 || Win ||align=left| John Marzullo || World Combat League  || Miami, Florida, United States || Points||  ||

|-  bgcolor="#cfc"
| 2005-09-03 || Win ||align=left| Freddie Espiricueta  || APEX - UNDISPUTED  || Montreal, Canada || TKO || 3 || 0:47

|-  bgcolor="#cfc"
| 2005-07-02 || Win ||align=left| Walter Baric ||  || Montreal, Canada || KO (Right cross)|| 1 ||

|-  bgcolor="#cfc"
| 2005-05-21 || Win ||align=left| Kadir Kadri|| Martial Arts May-Hem 05 || Greenville, South Carolina, United States || Decision (Unanimous)|| 7 ||2:00

|-  bgcolor="#cfc"
| 2004-12-14 || Win ||align=left| Eric Boudreau  || La renaissance du Kickboxing || Montreal, Canada || TKO (Right cross)|| 5 ||

|-  bgcolor="#cfc"
| 2004-11-06 || Win ||align=left| Jason Reeves || IKF Full Contact Kickboxing || Simpsonville, South Carolina, United States || KO (Right cross)|| 1 ||

|-  bgcolor="#cfc"
| 2004-05-15 || Win ||align=left| Kadir Kadri  || IKF Full Contact Kickboxing || Simpsonville, South Carolina, United States || TKO (Left hook to the body)|| 5 ||

|-  bgcolor="#cfc"
| 2002-07-19 || Win ||align=left| Eli Thompson  || ISKA 21st Century Warriors || Atlantic City, United States || TKO || 2 ||1:24

|-
| colspan=9 | Legend:    

|-
|-  bgcolor="#cfc"
| 2005-12-05 || Win ||align=left| Sergei Bogdan || 2005 WAKO World Championships, Final || Szeged, Hungary || Decision (Unanimous)|| 3 ||2:00
|-
! style=background:white colspan=9 |Wins 2005 WAKO World Championships Full Contact Cruiserweight (-86 kg) Gold Medal.

|-  bgcolor="#cfc"
| 2005-12-04 || Win ||align=left| Mairis Briedis || 2005 WAKO World Championships, Semi Final || Szeged, Hungary || Decision || 3 ||2:00

|-  bgcolor="#cfc"
| 2005-12-03 || Win ||align=left|  || 2005 WAKO World Championships, Quarter Final || Szeged, Hungary || ||  ||

|-  bgcolor="#cfc"
| 2005-12-02 || Win ||align=left|  || 2005 WAKO World Championships, 1/8 Final || Szeged, Hungary || ||  ||

|-  bgcolor="#cfc"
| 2003-11-15 || Win ||align=left| Kevin Engle || IKF Full Contact Kickboxing || Greenville, South Carolina, United States|| Decision (Unanimous) || 5 || 2:00
|-
! style=background:white colspan=9 |Wins IKF World Full Contact Light Cruiserweight title.

|-  bgcolor="#cfc"
| 2003-05-19 || Win ||align=left| Bill Jardine || Martial Arts May-Hem || Greenville, South Carolina, United States|| Decision (Unanimous) || 5 || 3:00

|-  bgcolor="#cfc"
| 2003-01-26 || Win ||align=left| Alejandro Garcia Lopez || IKF Team World Cup || Cancun, Mexico || TKO || 2 || 1:07

|-  bgcolor="#cfc"
| 2002-11-16 || Win ||align=left| Bill Jardine || IKF Full Contact Kickboxing || Greenville, South Carolina, United States|| TKO (Ref. Stoppage/Punches) || 4 ||1:26
|-
! style=background:white colspan=9 |Wins IKF North American Full Contact Light Cruiserweight title.

|-  bgcolor="#cfc"
| 2002-08-04 || Win ||align=left| John Scanlon || 2002 IKF USA National Amateur Championship Tournament, Final || Davenport, Iowa, United States|| KO (Head kick) || 1 ||1:37
|-
! style=background:white colspan=9 |Wins 2002 IKF USA National Amateur Championship Full-Contact Light Heavyweight title.

|-  bgcolor="#cfc"
| 2002-03-16 || Win ||align=left| Ruben Lopez || IKF Full Contact Kickboxing || Augusta, Georgia, United States|| TKO (arm injury) || 2 || 1:24
|-
! style=background:white colspan=9 |Wins IKF South East USA Full-Contact Light Heavyweight title.

|-  bgcolor="#cfc"
| 2001-11-10 || Win ||align=left| Nicholas Donahue || IKF: The Fall Brawl 2001 || Greenville, South Carolina, United States || KO (Axe kick + punch) || 2 ||0:20

|-  bgcolor="#cfc"
| 2001-09-09 || Win ||align=left| Vilavahn Seukpanya || 2001 IKF USA National Amateur Championship Tournament, Final || Olathe, Kansas, United States|| TKO (Broken arm/Kick) || 1 ||0:14
|-
! style=background:white colspan=9 |Wins 2001 IKF USA National Amateur Championship Full-Contact Light Heavyweight title.

|-  bgcolor="#cfc"
| 2001-07-14 || Win ||align=left| Claudiu Bucur || IKF: South East Regional Selection 2001 || Atlanta, Georgia, United States || KO (Head kick) || 3 ||0:50

|-  bgcolor="#cfc"
| 2001-06-16 || Win ||align=left| Demetrius Jones || IKF: Hot Summer Fights 2001 || Valdosta, Georgia, United States || TKO (retirement) || 1 ||2:00

|-  bgcolor="#cfc"
| 2000-09-03 || Win ||align=left| Peyton Russell || 2000 IKF USA National Amateur Championship Tournament, Final || Olathe, Kansas, United States|| Decision (Unanimous) || 3 ||2:00
|-
! style=background:white colspan=9 |Wins 2000 IKF USA National Amateur Championship Full-Contact Middleweight title.

|-  bgcolor="#cfc"
| 2000-09-02 || Win ||align=left| Mike Mason || 2000 IKF USA National Amateur Championship Tournament, Semi Final || Council Bluffs, Iowa, United States|| Decision (Unanimous) || 3 ||2:00

|-  bgcolor="#cfc"
| 2000-06-24 || Win ||align=left| JR Barnard || IKF: Hot Summer Fights 2000 || Valdosta, Georgia, United States || TKO (Referee stoppage) || 3 ||

|-  bgcolor="#cfc"
| 2000-05-06 || Win ||align=left| Keith Esskuchen || IKF: Spring Showdown 2000 || Augusta, Georgia, United States || Disqualification ||  ||

|-  bgcolor="#cfc"
| 1999-04-17 || Win ||align=left| James Dyson || IKF: Spring Showdown 1999 || Augusta, Georgia, United States || TKO ||  ||

|-  bgcolor="#cfc"
| 1999-02-06 || Win ||align=left| Scott Lee || IKF: Winter Wars 1999 || Augusta, Georgia, United States || Decision (Unanimous) || 3 ||2:00

|-
| colspan=9 | Legend:

See also
 List of current UFC fighters
 List of male mixed martial artists

References

External links
 
 

1983 births
Living people
American male mixed martial artists
Mixed martial artists from South Carolina
Welterweight mixed martial artists
Mixed martial artists utilizing jujutsu
Mixed martial artists utilizing karate
Mixed martial artists utilizing Kenpo
Mixed martial artists utilizing kickboxing
Mixed martial artists utilizing Brazilian jiu-jitsu
American male kickboxers
Kickboxers from South Carolina
People from Simpsonville, South Carolina
Middleweight kickboxers
Light heavyweight kickboxers
Cruiserweight kickboxers
American practitioners of Brazilian jiu-jitsu
American male karateka
American jujutsuka
Simpsonville, South Carolina
Ultimate Fighting Championship male fighters